Anthony 'Tony' M. Harper (6 December 1938 – 17 April 2013) was a Bermudian sprinter. He competed in the men's 400 metres at the 1968 Summer Olympics.

References

1938 births
2013 deaths
Athletes (track and field) at the 1968 Summer Olympics
Bermudian male sprinters
Olympic athletes of Bermuda
Athletes (track and field) at the 1966 British Empire and Commonwealth Games
Athletes (track and field) at the 1970 British Commonwealth Games
Commonwealth Games competitors for Bermuda
Place of birth missing